Dido is a ghost town in Tarrant County, located in Pecan Acres, Texas in the U.S. state of Texas.The family of Townes Van Zandt is buried in the Dido cemetery there.

References

Unincorporated communities in Tarrant County, Texas
Unincorporated communities in Texas
Ghost towns in Texas